Hueneme High School (HHS) is a public high school in Oxnard, California. The school is part of the Oxnard Union High School District and serves students in the southern portion of the city of Oxnard and most of Port Hueneme including part of Naval Base Ventura County.

History
Hueneme High School was established in 1959.

On June 4, 2016, during that year's election season, U.S. presidential candidate Hillary Clinton held a campaign rally inside the school's gymnasium.

Academics
Hueneme High School has hosted a Navy JROTC program since 1993.

Athletics
Hueneme High School athletic teams are nicknamed the Vikings. The school is a charter member of the Citrus Coast League, a conference within the CIF Southern Section (CIF-SS) that was established in 2018. From 1998 to 2018, Hueneme competed in the Pacific View League; prior to this, the school was a long-time member of the Channel League. The school's main rival is Channel Islands High School.

The HHS girls' basketball team won its first CIF-SS championship in 2018.

Boys teams:
 Baseball
 Basketball
 Cross country
 Football
 Golf
 Soccer
 Swimming
 Tennis
 Track & field
 Volleyball
 Water polo
 Wrestling

Girls teams:
 Basketball
 Cross country
 Golf
 Soccer
 Softball
 Swimming
 Tennis
 Track & field
 Volleyball
 Water polo
 Wrestling

Notable alumni
Freddie Bradley, NFL football player; first Hueneme High School athlete drafted into the NFL in 1996 (seventh round, pick #231)
Keary Colbert, football player for the USC Trojans; held the USC record for most receptions before it was broken by Dwayne Jarrett in 2006.
Charles Dillon, wide receiver for Green Bay Packers; graduated from HHS in 2004
Howard Hilton, MLB pitcher for the St. Louis Cardinals in 1990
Ronney Jenkins, football player; set the national record for most yards rushing in a single high school football game in 1995.
Josh Pinkard, free safety for the two championship USC Trojans football teams in 2004 and 2005
Josh Towers, MLB starting pitcher for the Toronto Blue Jays in 2003
 Jerry Willard, MLB baseball player; played for parts of eight seasons.

Notable faculty
 Dave Laut, U.S. Olympic shot put bronze medalist (1984) and Hueneme High School athletic director

References

External links

High schools in Oxnard, California
Public high schools in California
Port Hueneme, California
Buildings and structures in Oxnard, California
1959 establishments in California